The Nuova Enciclopedia Italiana (1875-1888) was a general knowledge, illustrated, Italian-language encyclopedia edited by economist  and published in Turin.

References

Further reading
  + Index
 v.1, A-Am
 v.3, B- (1877)
 v.4, Boo- (1877)
 v.5, Carl- (1878) 
 v.6, Co-Cz (1878)
 v.7, D
 v.9, Fe- (1880)
 v.10, Ge- (1880)
 v.13, M- (1882)
 v.14, Met-My 
 v.16, Orp- (1884)
 v.17, Pe-Po (1884)
 v.18, (1885)
 v.19, Re-San (1885)
 v.21, Sort- (1887)
 v.22, Te-Va
 v.23-24, Ve-Z

1875 non-fiction books
Italian online encyclopedias
Reference works in the public domain
Italian encyclopedias
Italian-language encyclopedias
19th-century encyclopedias